Tixan is a town in the Chimborazo province of Ecuador.  It has been found to have copper, sulfur, and gold.

Populated places in Chimborazo Province